With its , Hiva Oa is the second largest island in the Marquesas Islands, in French Polynesia, an overseas territory of France in the Pacific Ocean. Located at 9 45' south latitude and 139 W longitude, it is the largest island of the southern Marquesas group. Around 2,200 people reside on the island.

History

Colonial period
The first recorded sighting of Hiva Oa by the Europeans was by the Spanish expedition of Álvaro de Mendaña on 21 July 1595. They charted it as Dominica.

Overview

Administratively, Hiva Oa is part of the commune (municipality) of Hiva-Oa, itself in the administrative subdivision of the Marquesas Islands. Atuona, on the coast of Hiva Oa island, is the administrative centre of the commune. Atuona was formerly the seat of government for all of the Marquesas Islands, but it has been replaced by Taiohae on Nuku Hiva island.

The island is famous as the final home of French painter Paul Gauguin and Belgian singer Jacques Brel, both of whom are buried in Calvary Cemetery, overlooking Atuona. It is also home to the largest tiki sculptures in French Polynesia.

In late pre-European times, the island was nearly evenly divided into two provinces—Nuku in the west, and Pepane in the east.

Geography

Hiva Oa is the largest and most fertile of the southern Marquesas islands and second only to Nuku Hiva in size. Similar to all the larger Marquesas, Hiva Oa features steep cliffs abruptly rising from the ocean to a rugged interior spine of volcanic mountains, ridges, and deep, isolated valleys. Unlike most other Polynesian islands near the equator, no fringing coral reefs protect Hiva Oa from the pounding of the ocean and only a few sheltered anchorages and sandy beaches are scattered around the coast. Travel along the shoreline is by boat as most of the coastal terrain is too rugged for roads. A few dirt roads traverse the interior and link seacoast villages and settlements.

The outstanding geologic characteristic of Hiva Oa is the collapsed volcano Temetiu. Within Ta'a Oa are Atuona Bay and adjacent Taha Uku which are the best anchorages on the island.

Climate 

Temperatures in the Marquesas are stable year round, but precipitation is highly variable. Precipitation is much greater on the north and east (windward) parts of the islands and much less on the western (leeward) parts. Droughts, sometimes lasting several years, are frequent and seem to be associated with the El Niño phenomena.

Geology 
The island is of volcanic origin. Geologically, Hiva Oa belongs to the Marquesas Linear Volcanic Chain, which formed from a hot spot on the Pacific Plate and is moving west-northwest at a rate of 103 to 118 mm. per year. The magmatic rocks on the island are between 1.63 and 4.26 million years old, but volcanic activity has not yet been completely extinguished. Not far from the road from Atuona to Taaoa, further west, some mud pots and small solfataras can be seen.

Flora 
Like Nuku Hiva, Hiva Oa, as the second largest island in the archipelago, has a relatively high biodiversity for the South Pacific islands. A total of 205 native plants - 24 of them endemic - and 178 exotic species have been identified. Among the richest and most widespread native species on the island are ferns with a high number of endemic species. They cover large areas of the inaccessible, humid and shady incises of the valley. Among the idiocorophytes (ancient autochthonous species) are probably the coconut palm and the screw tree, which are widespread in the lowlands.

Anthropochorophytes, such as breadfruit trees and Tahitian chestnut (Inocarpus edulis), already introduced by Polynesian settlers, predominate in the lowland and midland regions. A threat to native plant communities could be bamboo, which is not native to the island and has already formed extensive groves in some places.

In the higher, more inaccessible areas of the island, the natural habitats remain almost unchanged. The north, shaded from wind and rain by the mountains, is largely arid.

Fauna 
The fauna of the Marquesas Islands is limited to land and sea birds, insects, reptiles, butterflies and spiders. The Marquesas warbler (Acrocephalus mendanae mendanae) is endemic to Hiva Oa and the neighboring island of Tahuata. There are no animals that are dangerous to humans. The nono fly, a type of black fly which occurs in the interior, is extremely unpleasant.

Population

In 2012, the population of Hiva Oa was 2,190, of which 1,845 lived in the commune of Acounda and 345 in the village of Puama'u. The inhabitants speak the southern Marquesan language, related to other Polynesian languages, and French.

Religion 
The majority of the island's population professes Christianity as a result of the activity of both Catholic missionaries and various Protestant groups. The Catholic Church controls 6 religious buildings on the island, including the Church of the Immaculate Conception (Église de l'Immaculée Conception) in Atuona (the island's capital), the Church of Saint Anne (Église de Sainte-Anne) in Hanaiapa, the Church of Our Lady of Lourdes (Église de Notre-Dame-de-Lourdes) in Hanapaaoa, the Church of Saint Joseph (Église de Saint-Joseph) in Nahoe, the Church of the Sacred Heart (Église du Sacré-Cœur) in Puamau, and the Church of Our Lady of the Sacred Heart (Église de Notre-Dame du Sacré-Cœur) in Taaoaoa.

According to the mythology of the ancient local religion, the gods created the Marquesas as their home. Therefore, all the islands have names related to the construction of a house: Hiva Oa means long ridge.

Economy 
Subsistence agriculture, a combination of fishing, pig and chicken farming, and the cultivation of staple crops such as breadfruit, coconut, yam, taro, sweet potatoes and bananas, remains the basis of the island's economy. Part of the copra is grown for export. Tourism has so far existed only to a small extent, but is economically important, as otherwise there are few jobs on the island. The currency is the CFP franc, which is pegged to the euro.

Infrastructure 
The settlements are only partially connected by paved roads. As the existing ones are also steep and winding, the preferred means of transport between the villages is still by boat. The west and the mountainous interior of the island are largely undeveloped.

The airfield, with a 1,250 m paved runway (ICAO code: NTMN, IATA code: HIX), is located on the Tepuna plateau, northeast of Atuona, and is connected to the village by a winding road.

Atuona has a fairly modern infrastructure, with a hospital, a medical and dental office, a post office (with satellite phone), a bank (with ATM), a national Gendarmerie station, a courthouse, schools with preschool (école maternelle et primaire) and a high school (Collège Sainte Anne), as well as a Catholic and a Protestant church. For tourist needs, there is a hotel and small private pensions, as well as restaurants and bars.

Larger cruise ships can also enter Atuona Bay. However, they are usually anchored and passengers are disembarked. Regular supply ships to/from Tahiti dock at the harbor pier.

Tourism

Places of interest 
The village of Puamau is 45 km from Atuona (a two and a half hour drive up a steep and winding road). On the outskirts of the village is a large ceremonial platform, said to be the burial place of Queen Vahine Titoiani. There are large stone tikis carved on two corners of the platform.

In the Puamau valley, about two kilometers from the coast, is Ipona (formerly: Oipona), the largest and most important historical site in the Marquesas. The valley once belonged to the influential Naiki tribe, which also controlled the Atuona region. After the Naiki captured and consumed the chief of the neighboring tribe, Tio'o, the clans of the Hanapaaoa district took revenge and wiped out the Naiki. The victors erected a tapu on Ipona and installed tikis. After the introduction of Christianity, this place of worship fell into disuse.

The Marae Takii, now well restored and consisting of three overlapping terraces, stands at the foot of a steep cliff and includes 8 stone statues and cyclopean heads. The largest is Tiki Takai'i, the guardian spirit of the valley, at 2.43 meters. However, the most interesting artwork is the Maki'i Taua Pepe figure, unique in the entire South Seas region, which, according to Karl von den Steinen, physician and ethnologist, depicts a priestess or goddess giving birth. According to Thor Heyerdahl, who visited Hiva Oa in 1937, the statue does not resemble a woman giving birth, but "more like an animal swimming," and he compared it to two sculptures of the "alligator god" from the St. Augustine culture. v.d. Steinen's interpretation of a woman in labor is contradicted by the fact that the base emerged from the navel region and not from the loins. He learned from his informants that the statue had long been lying on its back in a thicket and had only "recently" been erected. Another notable site is in the Vustin River valley.

Also notable is the Taaoa Valley, west of Atuona, which is filled with huge banyan trees, coconut palms, twenty-meter tall Barringtonia asiatica, many breadfruit trees, mango trees and Tahitian chestnuts. Among the dense undergrowth, it is difficult to distinguish most of the house and ceremonial platforms spread over an area of 3 ha, as little has been excavated and hardly anything has been restored. The Taaoa valley belonged to the sphere of influence of the powerful Tiu tribe, which plays a central role in the traditional myths of Hiva Oa. The buildings erected were correspondingly numerous and representative. In the center is a tohua, the largest of the Marquesas. A large tiki stands in the plaza and a stone head on one of the ceremonial platforms. Taro cultivation terraces have been found in the vicinity of the settlement. Ralph Linton explored this site as part of his expedition to the Marquesas, 1920/21, organized by the Bishop Museum.

The Eiaone Valley, west of Puamau, is known for its unique and particularly expressive semi-relief petroglyphs. However, most of them are covered by dense vegetation. There are other petroglyphs, stone images and platforms in the Tahauku and Punae (Punai) valleys east of Atuona.

The Atuona cultural center dedicated to the painter Paul Gauguin displays only copies of his paintings, but documents his life in the South Seas. His house, which was right next door, has been reconstructed. In the process a disused well was found where the later inhabitants had disposed of the painter's personal belongings, including a comb and toothbrush, jugs of wine, empty absinthe bottles, a morphine syringe, and tiger balm.

There are also some Jacques Brel memorabilia in Atuona. In 2003 a hangar was built especially for his Beechcraft D 50 Twin-Bonanza under the name "Jojo", which has been restored in the meantime. Photos and documents from Brel's stay in the South Seas over several years are also on display here. A monument to Jacques Brel has been erected on a lookout point on the airport road.

In the Calvaire Cemetery (Cimetière Calvaire), located above Atuona, are the graves of Gauguin and Brel. It is sometimes doubted that this is Gauguin's actual grave; it is said that he was buried unmarked and somewhere in the jungle. The cemetery is a much-visited lookout point, offering views of Taaoa Bay.

See also
Haʻava
Dependent Territory

References

External links

Gauguin Cultural Center in Atuona
Hiva Oa in 1842, Adventures of a man in Chapter XVII

Islands of the Marquesas Islands
Jacques Brel
Paul Gauguin